Sorcerers & Secretaries is a manga-influenced comic created by Amy Kim Ganter and was published by Tokyopop.

Further reading

External links
 TOKYOPOP's Rising Stars of Manga IV: Amy Kim Ganter on Sorcerers & Secretaries
 

Tokyopop titles
Original English-language manga